"Doctor" John Clarke (1773–1846) was an American businessman who played a major role in the development of Saratoga Springs, New York in the 1800s.  Usually called "Doctor Clarke", in fact the "Doctor" was a courtesy title.

Born in Yorkshire England, Clarke immigrated to America and settled in New York City.  In 1819 he opened the first soda fountain there. In 1823 he purchased land in Saratoga Springs with partner Thomas Lynch. The property included the Congress Spring in what is now Congress Park, at that time a swamp. Clarke drained the swamp to create a park and built a bottling plant there.  In 1825 Lynch and Clarke began bottling Congress Spring Water.  Lynch died in 1833 and Clarke continued the business alone.

Clarke built a doric pavilion to cover Congress Spring, which was torn down in 1876 when Frederick Law Olmsted redesigned the park and reconstructed in the 1970s.

Clarke planned and named Circular Street in Saratoga Springs, and in 1832 he built a Greek Revival mansion there overlooking Congress Park. He donated land to build an Episcopal church on the south-east corner of Circular Street and Union Avenue (then called East Congress Street). A change of plans resulted in the location moving to Washington Street where the Bethesda Episcopal Church was built in 1842.
However the original plan caused the site to be christened Temple Grove, and later the Temple Grove Ladies Seminary, a predecessor of Skidmore College was constructed on the site.

Clarke began to accumulate land east of Congress Park from the time he arrived in Saratoga Springs.

Dr. Clarke was married to Mrs. Eliza (Bryer) White, widow of Charles White, with whom he had three children, Eliza(September 6, 1829 – April 25, 1894), Thomas (d. August 16, 1880 ), and George B.  He died on May 6, 1846. and is buried in the Gideon Putnam Burying Ground in Saratoga Springs. Eliza first married Isaac Thayer and after his death in 1852 Cornelius Sheehan, and continued to occupy the house on Circular street.

References

American businesspeople
1773 births
1846 deaths
British emigrants to the United States
People from Saratoga Springs, New York
Burials in Saratoga County, New York